A house of mirrors or hall of mirrors is a traditional attraction at funfairs (carnivals) and amusement parks.  The basic concept behind a house of mirrors is to be a maze-like puzzle. In addition to the maze, participants are also given mirrors as obstacles, and glass panes to parts of the maze they cannot yet get to. Sometimes the mirrors may be distorted because of different curves, convex, or concave in the glass to give the participants unusual and confusing reflections of themselves, some humorous and others frightening.

References in fiction

Literary 
The first known literary example is in Gaston Leroux's novel The Phantom of the Opera (1911), in which Erik has built one for the Shah of Persia as a trap and later uses a similar trap house to protect his lair from his enemies.

The concept has also been used in comics. In Batman: The Dark Knight Returns, Batman is seen chasing the Joker through an amusement park and into a hall of mirrors. It was used to create suspense as Joker could not clearly decipher what was real and what was just an image.

Film 

In Charlie Chaplin's 1928 movie The Circus, Charlie Chaplin is chased into a mirror maze by a thief and the police.

The climax of the 1948 Orson Welles film The Lady from Shanghai (1948) takes place in a maze of mirrors.

In the finale of Enter the Dragon (1973), Bruce Lee's character navigates a mirror maze by breaking through the mirrors.

Francisco Scaramanga's "Fun House" in the 1974 James Bond film The Man with the Golden Gun has a house of mirrors.

In John Boorman's 1974 movie Zardoz, character "Z" (Sean Connery) battles against "The Vortex" in a mirror maze.

The 1983 Walt Disney movie Something Wicked This Way Comes (an adaptation of Ray Bradbury's novel of the same title) culminates in a house of mirrors confrontation.

The 1984 movie Conan the Destroyer with Arnold Schwarzenegger contains a house of mirrors fight.

Woody Allen's movie Manhattan Murder Mystery (1993) makes reference to the house of mirrors sequence from The Lady from Shanghai.

In John Wick: Chapter 2 (2017), John Wick (Keanu Reeves) engages in a chase, gunfight, and climactic knife fight in a modern art museum exhibit called "Reflections of the Soul" made of halls, rooms, and stairways lined with mirrors.

A house of mirrors features prominently in Jordan Peele's 2019 horror film Us.

Music 
The Kraftwerk album Trans-Europe Express includes a song called "The Hall of Mirrors". Fusion guitarist Allan Holdsworth also has a song called "House of Mirrors" of his Hard Hat Area album.  The Insane Clown Posse album The Ringmaster has a song called "House of Mirrors", representing it as one of the attractions of the Dark Carnival.

Television 

In Season 3, Episode 7 of Stranger Things, the character "Hopper" (David Harbour) leads a Russian assassin into a mirror maze.

In an episode of the Twilight Zone, "In Praise of Pip", a bookie tries to tell his dying son how much he loves him while chasing him inside a house of mirrors.

Other notable examples include the CBS soap opera Guiding Light which, in 1980, featured a now famous sequence that depicted heroine Rita Bauer (Lenore Kasdorf) being pursued through a hall of mirrors by villain Roger Thorpe (Michael Zaslow); the show Macgyver, where Jack Dalton is brainwashed and is forced to fire on Macgyver; and Teen Titans episode "Betrayal".

In "The Carnival Job", a fourth season episode of the show Leverage, Elliot has a showdown with Molly's captors in a house of mirrors.

History 
The origins of the house of mirrors stem from the hall of mirrors in the Palace of Versailles.

See also
 Curved mirror
 Escape room
 List of amusement rides
 Musée Grévin

References

Amusement park attractions
Mirror
Mirrors